Tursi is a town and comune in the province of Matera, in the southern Italian region of Basilicata.

History 
In the 9th century it was a stronghold of the Saracens in southern Italy.

In 968, Tursi became the capital of the Byzantine theme of Lucania and the seat of the bishop was transferred there from Anglona.

Anglona

Within the present municipality of Tursi there was a Greek colony called Pandosia, inland from the younger and more powerful Greek colony of Heraclea, so that it was in vicinity of Pandosia that what is known as the Battle of Heraclea was fought in 280 BC. It was destroyed in the Social War (90–88 BC).

The town of Anglona later arose on its ruins, the first documentary evidence of the name being of the year 747: locus qui dicitur Anglonum. In 410 it was destroyed by the troops of Alaric I, and in the 9th century a Saracen raid led to its temporary abandonment. The Byzantine reconquest under Emperor Nikephoros II Phokas of what became the (theme of Lucania in about 968, made Tursi the capital of the theme. The seat of the bishopric was moved from Anglona to the new capital. At the end of the 11th century, the bishop's seat was again moved to Anglona, which held a better strategic position. It was at this time that the prestigious sanctuary church of Saint Mary of Anglona was built on the site of an earlier church. However, in the following centuries Anglona declined and Tursi became again more important. After some leading figures in Tursi actually destroyed the town of Anglona, the seat of the bishop was transferred again to Tursi by decrees of 1545 and 1546, which however required that Anglona was to have first place in the denomination of was then called the Diocese of Anglona and Tursi. A restructuring of the dioceses of Basilicata on 8 September 1976 included a change of the name to Diocese of Tursi-Lagonegro, making Anglona a titular see.

The  is a national monument. It is a tuff and travertine construction, particularly notable for the external decoration of the apse, with numerous small arches, sculpted panels and a large central window flanked by small columns. The narthex of the entrance has a portal with reliefs with the lamb, symbols of the four Evangelists and other symbolic figures. The bell tower is in Romanesque style

The church is on the Latin cross plan, with a nave and two aisles separated by five arcades in different styles. Traces of the 14th-century frescoes with Scenes of the Old and Testament have been recently restored.

Other sights

In the ancient semi-fortified village of Rabatana  are the remains of a castle built around a 5th century tower erected by Visigoths. There is also the church of Santa Maria Maggiore (10th-11th centuries: largely rebuilt in the Baroque style, it has maintained its 15th-century façade. The interior has a nave and two aisles, and is home to a priceless 14th century triptych portraying the Virgin Enthroned with Child and Scenes of the Life of Jesus, attributed to the school of Giotto.

The cathedral of Tursi dates from the 15th-16th centuries.

References 

Cities and towns in Basilicata
Castles in Italy